The 1987 Goody's 500 was a NASCAR Winston Cup Series racing event that was held on September 27, 1987, at Martinsville Speedway in  Martinsville, Virginia.

The most dominant drivers in the NASCAR Winston Cup Series during the 1980s were  Dale Earnhardt, Bill Elliott, Darrell Waltrip, Terry Labonte, and Bobby Allison.

Background
Martinsville Speedway is one of five short tracks to hold NASCAR races. The track's turns are banked at eleven degrees, while the front stretch, the location of the finish line, is banked at zero degrees. The back stretch also has a zero degree banking.

Race report
There were 31 American-born drivers on the starting grid; Buddy Baker was credited with the last-place finish due to an issue with his brakes on lap 39 (of 500). Bonnett would break his wrists during this race but kept on racing as nobody was eliminated from the race yet during lap 40. Most of the drivers who failed to finish the race had problems with either crashing into other drivers, their engine, or with overheating. Former NASCAR driver Bryan Baker attempted to qualify for the field but failed to make it; this race would have been his Winston Cup Series debut had he qualified. His only professional stock car racing event came at the 1986 Delaware 500.

This race contained typical Martinsville racing where three cars are nearly touching going into turn 1 or 3 and have to slow way down to make the turn. However, the third car does not slow down enough, and turns their wheel to the right into the second car's left rear end. It is going to push the second car into the first car and cause them both to spin too far in the direction they are turning.

During the closing laps of the race, a closely packed racing trio (consisting of Earnhardt, Labonte, and Waltrip) would constantly bang on each other for the chance to finish the race as the winner. Those three drivers raced in a similar manner to current NASCAR Sprint Cup Series drivers Tony Stewart, Jeff Gordon and Jimmie Johnson. Martinsville's own Buddy Arrington makes his final Cup start on his hometown track but the #67 Pannill Knitting Ford was sidelined on the 87th lap by overheating issues. Virginia racer Curtis Markham, making just his second Cup start, ends up sidelined on lap 203 but still finishes in 26th place to claim the best finish of his short career in the series. This was the first of three late-season races for Markham in Elmo Langley's #64 Ford, he'd become the team's last new driver before it closed at the end of the year.

Darrell Waltrip's oldest daughter Jessica would be born just 10 days prior to this race. This is similar to current driver Jimmie Johnson and now-retired driver Jeff Gordon winning races after the births of their respective daughters (Genevieve Marie for Johnson and Ella Sofia for Jeff Gordon).

Other notable drivers in this race were Terry Labonte, Neil Bonnett, Alan Kulwicki, Bill Elliott and Michael Waltrip. Forty-four thousand fans would see almost three and a half hours of racing with eight caution flags being handed out for a staggering 35 laps. Both Richard Petty and his son Kyle participated in this racing event. This was J.D. McDuffie's final top 20. He finished 17th, 42 laps down of 31 cars.

Notable crew chiefs who actively participated in the race were Joey Arrington, Andy Petree, Dale Inman, Harry Hyde, Travis Carter, Larry McReynolds, Bud Moore, Tim Brewer, Kirk Shelmerdine among others.

Waltrip would earn $43,830 out of the prize purse ($ when adjusted for inflation) while last-place finisher Baker would acquire a meager $1,160 ($ when adjusted for inflation).

Qualifying

Finishing order
Section reference:

 Darrell Waltrip (No. 17)
 Dale Earnhardt (No. 3)
 Terry Labonte (No. 11)
 Neil Bonnett (No. 75)
 Morgan Shepherd (No. 26)
 Alan Kulwicki (No. 7)
 Sterling Marlin (No. 44)
 Bobby Allison (No. 22)
 Kyle Petty (No. 21)
 Dale Jarrett (No. 18)
 Bill Elliott (No. 9)
 Ken Schrader (No. 90)
 Richard Petty (No. 43)
 Harry Gant* (No. 33)
 Ernie Irvan (No. 6)
 Phil Parsons (No. 55)
 J.D. McDuffie (No. 70)
 Michael Waltrip (No. #30)
 Steve Christman (No. 62)
 Geoffrey Bodine (No. 5)
 Ricky Rudd* (No. 15)
 Bobby Hillin Jr.* (No. 8)
 Benny Parsons* (No. 35)
 Greg Sacks* (No. 50)
 Slick Johnson* (No. 12)
 Curtis Markham* (No. 64)
 Dave Marcis* (No. 71)
 Rusty Wallace* (No. 27)
 Buddy Arrington* (No. 67)
 Jimmy Means* (No. 52)
 Buddy Baker* (No. 88)

* Driver failed to finish race

Standings after the race

References

Goody's 500
Goody's 500
NASCAR races at Martinsville Speedway